In human anatomy, the greater sac, also known as the general cavity (of the abdomen) or peritoneum of the peritoneal cavity proper, is the cavity in the abdomen that is inside the peritoneum but outside the lesser sac.  

It is connected with the lesser sac via the omental foramen, also known as the foramen of Winslow or epiploic foramen, which is anteriorly bounded by the portal triad – portal vein, hepatic artery, and common bile duct.

Additional images

See also

 Omental bursa (Lesser sac)
 Omental foramen (Epiploic foramen, Foramen of Winslow)
 Lesser omentum
 Greater omentum
 Peritoneum

External links
 
 
 Diagram at ccccd.edu
 Dissection video at University of Bristol

General surgery
Abdomen